The 1935–36 Challenge Cup was the 36th staging of rugby league's oldest knockout competition, the Challenge Cup.

First round

Second round

Quarterfinals

Semifinals

Final
Leeds beat Warrington 18-2 in the Challenge Cup Final played at Wembley Stadium on Saturday 18 April 1936 before a crowd of 51,250.

Evan Williams' three goals gave Leeds the victory.

This was Leeds’ fourth Challenge Cup final win in as many final appearances.

References

Challenge Cup
Challenge Cup